James Ferguson of Pitfour may refer to:

 James Ferguson, 1st Laird of Pitfour (1672–1734), Scottish lawyer
 James Ferguson, Lord Pitfour (1700–1777), Scottish advocate
 James Ferguson (Scottish politician) (1735–1820),  Scottish advocate and Tory politician